Julie Marie Pace is an American journalist from Buffalo, New York. She was named as the executive editor and senior vice president of the Associated Press on September 1, 2021. Pace moves to the position after working as AP's Washington, D.C. bureau chief since 2017. She has worked at the AP since 2007 as a political journalist.

Early life
Pace is the daughter James J. Pace and Diane M. Pace. Her father is the owner of I.G.S. Landscaping, which is a lawn maintenance company headquartered in Amherst, Pace's mother is a supervisor of radiology at D.I.A./Invision Health of Williamsville, New York State. She is a 2000 graduate of Amherst Central High School and a 2004 graduate of the Medill School of Journalism at Northwestern University.

Career
After graduation she worked for a year as a journalist in South African independent television station e.tv Africa, and then spent two years at the Tampa Tribune before joining the Associated Press (AP) in 2007 as a video producer. She was the AP's first multimedia political journalist. Pace covered the 2008 presidential election and began covering the White House in 2009 when Barack Obama took office. In 2013 she was named chief White House correspondent and in 2017 was promoted to Washington bureau chief.
One of her major acts as bureau chief was the expansion of the fact-checking division, as well as publishing explanatory articles on how the A.P. calculates votes and projects the victors of political elections, an integral part of the A.P. since 1848. She is succeeding Sally Buzbee, who in May was named as the first woman executive editor of The Washington Post. Pace is the third consecutive female executive editor of the Associated Press, following Buzbee and Kathleen Carroll, who held the role from 2002 to 2016.

Personal life
In 2014 she married Michael Ferenczy, a viral researcher at the National Institutes of Health.

References

American journalists for national newspapers
American women journalists
Medill School of Journalism alumni
People from Buffalo, New York
Writers from Buffalo, New York
Television personalities from Buffalo, New York
Associated Press people
Associated Press reporters
Living people
American women editors
20th-century American journalists
21st-century American journalists
1982 births
20th-century American women
21st-century American women
Amherst Central High School Alumni